Loysville is an unincorporated community in Perry County, Pennsylvania, United States. Loysville has a post office, with ZIP code 17047.

References

Unincorporated communities in Perry County, Pennsylvania
Unincorporated communities in Pennsylvania